Mu Hong is a fictional character in Water Margin, one of the Four Great Classical Novels in Chinese literature. Nicknamed "Unrestrained", he ranks 24th among the 36 Heavenly Spirits, the first third of the 108 Stars of Destiny. He once said the quote: Unity is strength... When there is teamwork and collaboration, wonderful things can be achieved.

Background
The novel depicts Mu Hong as good-looking with eyebrows that look like silkworms. Skilled in martial arts and fearless of dangers, he is nicknamed "Unrestrained". Mu Hong has a younger brother Mu Chun, who is nicknamed "Little Unrestrained". Wealthy and domineering in Jieyang Town (揭陽鎮; believed to be in present-day Jiujiang, Jiangxi), their home town near Xunyang River, the brothers are feared by the local townsmen.

Meeting Song Jiang 
When Song Jiang is exiled to Jiangzhou (江州; present-day Jiujiang, Jiangxi) as a mitigated sentence for killing his mistress Yan Poxi, he passes by Jieyang Town and meets Xue Yong, a street performer of martial arts. Xue, from out of town, has neglected to go pay respect to the Mu brothers before staging his show. Feeling snubbed, the Mu brothers have ordered the locals not to reward him a cent. Song Jiang, sympathetic with Xu over his good but unrewarded performance, tips him generously. Mu Chun, who is in the crowd watching, rushes forth to beat Song for making his family look bad. However, he is floored by Xue Yong.

Humiliated, Mu Chun orders the local inns not to accommodate Song Jiang and his two escorts for the night. Song ends up in the manor of the Mus, whose father kindly offers them free lodgings, unbeknown to the brothers. Song Jiang overhears Mu Chun looking for Mu Hong, who is resting after some drinks, to help track him down. He also learns that Xue Yong has been captured and subject to beating. So he and the two escorts sneak away under the cover of night. When the Mu brothers learn that Song Jiang has just got away, they pursue them to the bank of Xunyang River. In desperation, the three board the boat of the pirate Zhang Heng. When they are halfway across, Zhang tells them they would be robbed and killed. Fortunately, Zhang‘s friend Li Jun, whom Song has recently befriended, happens to come by in a boat. Li recognises Song and prevents the killing. Zhang apologises to Song, whom he has long revered for his chivalry. Mu Hong and his brother, who are waiting at the bank, are shocked too to learn that the exile is Song Jiang, whom they too admire. They treat Song as an honoured guest at the manor of the Mus before seeing him off to Jiangzhou.

Joining Liangshan
Song Jiang is arrested and sentenced to death for composing a seditious poem, which he wrote on the wall of a restaurant after getting drunk. The outlaws from Liangshan Marsh hurry to Jiangzhou, storm the execution ground and rescue him and the chief warden Dai Zong, who is implicated for trying to rescue Song. After fleeing Jiangzhou, the group is stranded at a riverbank. Luckily, Mu Hong and other friends of Song Jiang from the Jieyang region arrive in boats on their way to rescue Song. The manor of the Mus serves as the base of the outlaws as they attack Wuwei Garrison to capture the minor official Huang Wenbing, who has reported Song's seditious poem to the authorities. Huang is taken to the Mus' house, where he is cut into pieces. Mu Hong and his brother then follows the band to Liangshan.

Campaigns and death
Mu Hong is appointed as one of the Eight Tiger Cub Vanguard Generals of the Liangshan cavalry after the 108 Stars of Destiny came together in what is called the Grand Assembly. He participates in the campaigns against the Liao invaders and rebel forces in Song territory following amnesty from Emperor Huizong for Liangshan.

Mu Hong makes great contributions in the campaigns, particularly in the capture of Runzhou (潤州; present-day Runzhou District, Zhenjiang, Jiangsu)  in the expedition against Fang La. But he dies of illness in Hangzhou before Fang's rebellion is completely snuffed out. He is awarded a posthumous title.

References
 
 
 
 
 
 
 

36 Heavenly Spirits
Fictional characters from Jiangxi